Michael Tannous is a Lebanon international rugby league footballer who plays as a Halfback, Five-eighth and Hooker for the Wests Tigers in the NRL.

Background
Tannous is of Lebanese descent.

Playing career

Club career
Tannous is contracted to the Wests Tigers.

International career
Tannous made his international debut 30-14 win against Malta in June 2022.

Tannous made his World Cup international debut for Lebanon in their 34-12 loss to New Zealand at the 2021 Rugby League World Cup in October 2022.

References

External links
Lebanon profile

Living people
Lebanon national rugby league team players
Rugby league hookers
2002 births